The 1936 United States presidential election in Kentucky took place on November 3, 1936, as part of the 1936 United States presidential election. Kentucky voters chose 11 representatives, or electors, to the Electoral College, who voted for president and vice president.

Kentucky was won by incumbent President Franklin D. Roosevelt (D–New York), running with Vice President John Nance Garner, with 58.51 percent of the popular vote, against Governor Alf Landon (R–Kansas), running with Frank Knox, with 39.92 percent of the popular vote.

Results

Results by county

Notes

References

Kentucky
1936
1936 Kentucky elections